The 1982 NCAA Division I women's basketball tournament was the first Women's Basketball Tournament held under the auspices of the NCAA. From 1972 to 1982, there were national tournaments for Division I schools held under the auspices of the AIAW. The inaugural NCAA Tournament included 32 teams. Tennessee, Louisiana Tech, Cheyney, and Maryland met in the Final Four, held at the Norfolk Scope in Norfolk, Virginia and hosted by Old Dominion University, with Louisiana Tech defeating Cheyney for the title, 76-62. Louisiana Tech's Janice Lawrence was named the Most Outstanding Player of the tournament. Her teammate Kim Mulkey went on to become the first (and to date only) woman to win NCAA Division I basketball titles as a player and coach, winning the 2005, 2012 and 2019 titles as head coach at Baylor (Mulkey was also an assistant coach on Louisiana Tech's 1988 championship team).

Notable events

While the 1982 tournament was the first tournament under the NCAA, many of the participating teams had a long history of tournament experience. The Louisiana Tech team made it to the Final Four of the 1979, 1980 and 1981 AIAW Tournaments, winning the National Championship with a perfect 34–0 record in 1981. The Lady Techsters were favorites to repeat, as their team entered the 1982 NCAA tournaments with only a single loss on the season. The team included two Kodak All-Americans, Pam Kelly and Angela Turner. Pam Kelly would win the Wade Trophy, awarded to the nation's best Division I women's basketball player. Her teammates included Janice Lawrence and Kim Mulkey, both of whom would play on the gold-medal-winning Olympic team in 1984. The team had two head coaches. Sonja Hogg had been head coach of the team since its formation in 1974. Hogg brought Leon Barmore on to the coaching staff in 1977. In 1982, Barmore shared head coaching duties with Hogg, which he would do until 1985, when Hogg stepped down.

The Louisiana Tech team won their first game easily, beating Tennessee Tech 114–52. They easily won their next two games against Arizona State and Kentucky, to advance to the Final Four, the only number one seed to make it to the finals.

The Lady Techsters faced the Lady Vols from Tennessee in the semi-finals, and won 69–46. In the National Championship game, they faced Cheyney State, coached by future Hall of Fame coach C. Vivian Stringer. The Cheyney State team entered the match-up on a 23-game winning streak. The Louisiana Tech team hit 56% of their field goals attempts to win easily, 76–62, and win the first National Championship in the NCAA era.

The winners are awarded national championship rings, but this team did not receive theirs until January 13, 2017.

Records

In the semifinal game between Louisiana Tech and Tennessee, Louisiana Tech's Pam Kelly made twelve of fourteen free throw attempts. Twelve made free throws, equaled twice since, remains the Women's Final Four Game Record for "Most Free Throws" through the 2015 tournament.

In the west regional final between Drake and Maryland, Lorri Bauman scored 50 points in a losing effort. Her scoring mark is still the single game record for an NCAA Tournament game. Her 21 made field goals, out of 35 attempts, both of which remain as single game tournament records. In the first-round game against Ohio State, Bauman hit all 16 of her free throws. While several players have subsequently made all of their attempted free throws, no one has a perfect record with more than 16.

In the three games of her tournament, Bauman scored a total of 110 points, for an average of 36.7 points per game. No player has surpassed that per game scoring mark, through 2012.

Bauman's 50 point performance qualified as one of the top 25 moments of NCAA Tournament history as chronicled by ESPN and the NCAA.com as part of the 25th anniversary celebration of NCAA women's basketball.

Qualifying teams - automatic
Thirty-two teams were selected to participate in the 1982 NCAA Tournament. Twelve conferences were eligible for an automatic bid to the 1982 NCAA tournament. (Not all conference records are available for 1982)

Qualifying teams - at-large
Twenty additional teams were selected to complete the thirty-two invitations. (Not all conference records are available for 1982)

Bids by conference

First round
The thirty-two teams were seeded, and assigned to sixteen locations. In each case, the higher seed was given the opportunity to host the first-round game, and all sixteen teams hosted.

The following table lists the region, host school, venue and location, while a map of the locations is shown to the right:

Regionals and Final Four

The Regionals, named for the general location, were held from March 18 to March 21 at these sites:

 East Regional  Reynolds Coliseum, Raleigh, North Carolina (Host: North Carolina State University)
 Mideast Regional  Stokely Athletic Center, Knoxville, Tennessee (Host: University of Tennessee)
 Midwest Regional  Memorial Gym, Ruston, Louisiana (Host: Louisiana Tech University)
 West Regional  Maples Pavilion, Stanford, California (Host: Stanford University)

Each regional winner will advance to the Final Four, held March 26 and 28 in Norfolk, Virginia at the Norfolk Scope.

Bids by state

The thirty-two teams came from twenty-one states, plus Washington, D.C.
California and Tennessee had the most teams with three each. Twenty-nine states did not have any teams receiving bids.

Brackets

Mideast Regional - University of Tennessee - Knoxville, TN (Stokely Athletic Center)

Midwest Regional - Louisiana Tech - Ruston, LA (Memorial Gymnasium)

East Regional - N.C. State - Raleigh, NC (Reynolds Coliseum)

West Regional - Stanford University - Palo Alto, CA (Maples Pavilion)

Final Four - Old Dominion - Norfolk, VA

Record by conference
Eight conferences had more than one bid, or at least one win in NCAA Tournament play:

Six conferences went  0-1: MAAC, MAC, MEAC, Northern  California, Ohio Valley Conference, and SWAC

All-Tournament Team

 Janice Lawrence, Louisiana Tech
 Pam Kelly, Louisiana Tech
 Kim Mulkey, Louisiana Tech
 Yolanda Laney, Cheyney
 Valerie Walker, Cheyney

Game officials

 David Sell (semifinal)
 Pete Stewart (semifinal)
 Marcy Weston (Semi-Final, Final)
 Dan Woolridge (Semi-Final, Final)

See also
 1982 NCAA Division II women's basketball tournament
 1982 NCAA Division III women's basketball tournament
 1982 AIAW National Division I Basketball Championship
 1982 NAIA women's basketball tournament
 1982 NCAA Division I men's basketball tournament

References

 
NCAA Division I women's basketball tournament
NCAA Division I women's basketball tournament
NCAA Division I women's basketball tournament